Donna Wynd (born 22 October 1961 in Auckland) is a track cyclist from New Zealand, who competes in the women's sprint event.

At the 1994 Commonwealth Games at Victoria, B.C. she came third, winning a bronze medal.

At the 1996 Summer Olympics at Atlanta she came 12th.

References 

 Black Gold by Ron Palenski (2008, 2004 New Zealand Sports Hall of Fame, Dunedin) p. 98

External links 
 
 

Living people
1961 births
New Zealand track cyclists
New Zealand female cyclists
Cyclists at the 1996 Summer Olympics
Olympic cyclists of New Zealand
Commonwealth Games bronze medallists for New Zealand
Cyclists at the 1994 Commonwealth Games
Cyclists from Auckland
Commonwealth Games medallists in cycling
20th-century New Zealand women
Medallists at the 1994 Commonwealth Games